"Seite an Seite" is a song by Austrian recording artist Christina Stürmer. It was written by Christoph Koterzina, Markus Schlichtherle, and Daniel Flamm for her same-titled seventh studio album (2016), while production was helmed by Eki von Nice.

Formats and track listings

Charts

References

External links
 

2016 singles
2016 songs
Christina Stürmer songs